David Balaguer Romeu (born 17 August 1991) is a Spanish handball player who plays for Paris Saint-Germain and the Spanish team.

He participated at the 2017 World Men's Handball Championship.

References

1991 births
Living people
Sportspeople from Barcelona
Spanish male handball players
Liga ASOBAL players
FC Barcelona Handbol players
Expatriate handball players
Spanish expatriate sportspeople in France
Handball players from Catalonia